Reliance Stadium or Indian Petrochemicals Corporation Ltd Sports Complex Ground also known as the IPCL Ground is located in Vadodara, Gujarat.

The stadium is owned by Reliance Industries and is also known as, Reliance Stadium. The stadium is the home ground of the Baroda cricket team, one of India's domestic teams.

The stadium has hosted 10 ODI matches since 1994, the last one in 2010 (part of the India New Zealand series December 2010), but has yet to stage a Test match.

History

One of the four first-class and two international grounds in Vadodara, the IPCL Sports Complex Ground is part of the sprawling IPCL complex, situated about 10 kilometers from the city centre. The ground was owned and maintained by the Reliance Industries and has taken preference over the oldest cricket ground in Asia the Moti Bagh Stadium for ODIs. 

The batsmen have traditionally enjoyed this high-scoring venue with a true wicket that holds up throughout the length of a 50-over game.

One Day International cricket

The stadium has hosted following ODI matches till date.

Game Statistics:
{| class="wikitable"
|-
! Category
! Information
|-
| Highest Team Score
| India (341/3 in 50 overs against West Indies)
|-
| Lowest Team Score
| India (148 all out in 39.4 overs against Australia)
|-
| Best Batting Performance
| Gautam Gambhir (126 runs)
|-
| Most Prolific Batsman
| Sachin Tendulkar (442 Runs)
|-
| Best Bowling Performance
| Mitchell Johnson (5/26 against India)
|}

List of Centuries

Key
 * denotes that the batsman was not out.
 Inns. denotes the number of the innings in the match.
 Balls denotes the number of balls faced in an innings.
 NR denotes that the number of balls was not recorded.
 Parentheses next to the player's score denotes his century number at Edgbaston.
 The column title Date refers to the date the match started.
 The column title Result refers to the player's team result

One Day Internationals

List of Five Wicket Hauls

Key

One Day Internationals

Trivia
 Sachin Tendulkar has scored three centuries in six matches on this ground and won the Man of the Match award on all three occasions. Tendulkar's overall record is 442 runs at an average of 85.60. 
 The highest team score posted here is 341/3 on 31 Jan 2007 by the Indian national cricket team against West Indies national cricket team.
 The lowest team score posted here is 148 all out on 11 Oct 2007, also by Indian national cricket team against Australia national cricket team.
 The leading run scorers here have been Sachin Tendulkar- 442 runs, Saurav Ganguly- 290 runs and Gautam Gambhir- 194 runs. 
 The leading wicket takers here have been Mitchell Johnson- 7 wickets and Ajit Agarkar- 5 wickets.

References

External links
 Cricinfo Website - Ground Page
 cricketarchive Website - Ground Page
 Baroda Cricket Association 

Cricket grounds in Gujarat
Sport in Vadodara
Buildings and structures in Vadodara
Sports venues completed in 1990
1990 establishments in Gujarat
Reliance Sports
20th-century architecture in India